The Guizhou Plateau broadleaf and mixed forests are a subtropical moist broadleaf forest ecoregion in the Yungui Plateau of China.  Much of the original forest has been replaced by secondary forests.

Geography
The Guizhou Plateau broadleaf and mixed forests occupy the eastern portion of the Yungui Plateau.  The forests are found throughout most of Guizhou province, extreme northeastern Yunnan, southeastern Sichuan, southeastern Chongqing, southwestern Hubei, and western Hunan.

The geology in this part of the Yungui Plateau is composed of mostly Paleozoic limestone where there are poor quality soils and extreme karst topography. Human development in this part of China has been limited due to the nature of terrain where large pits, caves, natural arches, and disappearing rivers are not uncommon.

Flora
Despite the high level of precipitation, flora in this ecoregion is prone to drought stress because karstic soils here are porous and do not retain water.  In the northern parts of the Guizhou Plateau ecoregion, Chinese red pine is a major species while Yunnan pine dominates in the south. Broadleaf taxa include Rhododendron, Quercus, Sterculia, Erythrina, Ficus, Eugenia, Helicia.

The first-class protected plant species in the Guizhou Plateau broadleaf and mixed forests are Cathaya argyrophylla, Taiwania flousiana, Cyathea spinulosa, and the revered Davidia involucrata.

Fauna
The Guizhou snub-nosed monkey is endemic to this ecoregion. Other notable animal species include the Assamese macaque, Francois’ leaf monkey, clouded leopard, leopard, tiger, Sika deer, and red goral.

Conservation
While much of the original subtropical evergreen broadleaf forests in this ecoregion has been extirpated due to habitat conversion, secondary forests, seasonal tropical forests, and conifer forests now dominate.  Remaining tracts of the original forest vegetation can still be found in protected areas and along inaccessible hills.  Protected areas include Wulingyuan, Mount Fanjing, and Zhangjiajie.

References

Ecoregions of China
Palearctic ecoregions
Tropical and subtropical moist broadleaf forests